Matthias Moder (born 17 June 1963 in Torgau) is a retired East German hammer thrower.

He finished seventh at the 1986 European Championships. Moder represented the sports club SC Dynamo Berlin, and became East German champion in 1985.

His personal best throw was 80.92 metres, achieved in June 1985 in Halle, Germany.

References

1963 births
Living people
German male hammer throwers
East German male hammer throwers
People from Torgau
Sportspeople from Saxony